Alpha Epsilon Delta is a U.S.  health preprofessional honor society. The organization currently has more than 144,000 members within 186 chapters at universities throughout the United States, making it the world's largest Honor Society serving all students from different backgrounds in the pursuit of a career in healthcare.

History 
On April 28, 1926, fifteen premedical students at the University of Alabama met with Dr. Jack Montgomery,  premedical adviser and professor of organic chemistry, to formalize the organization of a new premedical honor society. Baylor University, Samford University, The University of Texas, and the University of South Carolina established chapters in 1928/29. At the first national convention at the University of Alabama on April 18, 1930, ten  members representing five chapters and one petitioning group were in attendance.

In February 1929 the first two women were initiated as members, making Alpha Epsilon Delta one of the earliest co-educational honor societies established.

In 1949, AED was incorporated in the State of Michigan. In February 1962, the Society was reincorporated in the District of Columbia as a nonprofit, educational organization.

The business of the Society is conducted by the National Officers, Regional Directors, and active chapters, with authorization of the national convention, held biennially.

Alpha Epsilon Delta (AED) has today become the world's largest Honor Society exclusively serving premedical education, with a membership exceeding 144,000 in 186 chapters.

Mission statement 
"Alpha Epsilon Delta is the National Health Pre-professional Honor Society dedicated to the encouragement and recognition of excellence in preprofessional health scholarship, including medicine, dentistry, veterinary, and others. The Society welcomes ALL students engaged in the pursuit of a professional healthcare career. AED offers opportunities for intellectual and professional development, provides a forum for students with common interests, and extends a program of service to benefit the college/university community. "

Membership 
Membership is open to undergraduate students with a major interest in medicine and who meet the minimum requirements. Some chapters offer an Associate membership for those who have yet to meet these requirements.

Achievement of 3.2 or higher (on a 4.0 scale) science and overall GPA
Complete at least three semesters (five quarters) of college credit/preprofessional health work
Good standing with your University's chapter
A certain number of volunteer hours may be required as well

Traditions and insignia
The badge consists of a hexagonal key or pin on the face of which in inscribed ΑΕΔ in a longitudinal column.  The key is reminiscent of the benzene ring, while the border is emblematic of the continuity of premedical science.

Baird's Manual had originally listed the society's colors as ultraviolet and infrared; the current Constitution notes them as red and violet.
 
The official magazine, The Scalpel, is published at least two times per year, the AED Newsletter at least four times per year, as well as Notes to Alumni.

Notable chapters 
Chapters may be formed at four-year accredited institutions.  There are over 180 active chapters today, including:
California Delta Chapter - University of San Diego
Michigan Iota Chapter - Western Michigan University
Kansas Alpha Chapter - Kansas State University
Texas Nu Chapter - University of Texas at Dallas
Texas Zeta chapter - Texas Christian University (AED national headquarters)
Florida Alpha chapter - University of Florida
Florida Epsilon chapter - Florida International University
Texas Beta chapter - Baylor University
Arizona Beta chapter - the University of Arizona
Alabama Zeta chapter - the University of South Alabama
Alabama Delta chapter - University of Alabama, Birmingham
Georgia Alpha chapter - University of Georgia
Illinois Zeta chapter - Elmhurst College
Texas Alpha chapter - University of Texas - Austin
South Carolina Alpha chapter -  University of South Carolina
Ohio Beta chapter -  University of Toledo
Missouri Beta chapter - Saint Louis University
Pennsylvania Beta chapter - Pennsylvania State University
New York Alpha chapter - Cornell University
Washington Beta chapter - University of Washington, Seattle
Michigan Epsilon chapter - University of Michigan, Ann Arbor
Ohio Alpha chapter - Ohio State University
Minnesota Alpha chapter - University of Minnesota
Louisiana Alpha chapter - Tulane University
California Theta chapter - University of California, Los Angeles
Nevada Beta chapter - University of Nevada, Las Vegas
Michigan Gamma chapter - Michigan State University
Texas Lambda chapter - University of Texas, San Antonio
North Carolina Beta chapter - University of North Carolina - Chapel Hill
North Carolina Epsilon chapter - East Carolina University
Kentucky Gamma chapter - Western Kentucky University
Massachusetts Zeta chapter - Northeastern University
Colorado Alpha chapter - University of Colorado Boulder
North Carolina Delta chapter - North Carolina State University
Wisconsin Beta chapter - University of Wisconsin–Madison

References

External links 
National Office Website
 ACHS Alpha Epsilon Delta entry
 Alpha Epsilon Delta chapter list at ACHS

Association of College Honor Societies
Student organizations established in 1926
Medical and health organizations based in Texas
1926 establishments in Alabama
University of Alabama